Kingston is an unincorporated community and census-designated place (CDP) in northeast Madison County, Arkansas, United States.  It was first listed as a CDP in the 2020 census with a population of 97.

Kingston was platted in 1853 by King Johnson, and named for him.

Geography
Kingston is located at the intersection of Arkansas highways 21 and 74. Kingston is located in the Kings River valley. The stream forms the western edge of the CDP and flows north to the White River in Missouri.

Education 
Public education for elementary and secondary school students is provided by the Jasper School District, which includes:
 Kingston Elementary School, serving kindergarten through grade 6.
 Kingston High School, serving grades 7 through 12.

On July 1, 2004, the Kingston School District, along with the Oark School District, merged into the Jasper district.

Demographics

2020 census

Note: the US Census treats Hispanic/Latino as an ethnic category. This table excludes Latinos from the racial categories and assigns them to a separate category. Hispanics/Latinos can be of any race.

References

External links

Unincorporated communities in Madison County, Arkansas
Unincorporated communities in Arkansas
Census-designated places in Madison County, Arkansas
Census-designated places in Arkansas